Bonnie Toogood (born 8 December 1997) is an Australian rules footballer playing for the Essendon Football Club in the AFL Women's competition (AFLW). Toogood was drafted by the Western Bulldogs with their second selection and eleventh overall in the 2017 AFL Women's rookie draft. She made her debut in the twenty-six point win against  at VU Whitten Oval in the opening round of the 2018 season. She was named one of the ' best players in the opening match of the 2021 AFL Women's season, kicking 2 goals and 1 behind, while also collecting 9 disposals and 3 marks. It was revealed that Toogood had signed a contract extension with the club on 16 June 2021, after playing every game possible for the club that season.

Toogood was educated at Melbourne Grammar and Melbourne Girl’s Grammar.

Statistics
Statistics are correct to the end of the 2021 season.

|- style="background-color: #eaeaea"
| scope=row bgcolor=F0E68C | 2018# || 
| 28 || 8 || 5 || 2 || 44 || 20 || 64 || 19 || 14 || 0.6 || 0.3 || 5.5 || 2.5 || 8.0 || 2.4 || 1.8 || 1
|- 
! scope="row" style="text-align:center" | 2019
|style="text-align:center;"|
| 28 || 6 || 1 || 0 || 19 || 4 || 23 || 10 || 6 || 0.2 || 0.0 || 3.2 || 0.7 || 3.9 || 1.7 || 1.0 || 0
|- style="background-color: #eaeaea"
! scope="row" style="text-align:center" | 2020
|style="text-align:center;"|
| 8 || 4 || 4 || 2 || 18 || 11 || 29 || 9 || 9 || 1.0 || 0.5 || 4.5 || 2.8 || 7.3 || 2.3 || 2.3 || 2
|- 
! scope="row" style="text-align:center" | 2021
|style="text-align:center;"|
| 8 || 9 || 9 || 5 || 54 || 28 || 82 || 26 || 23 || 1.0 || 0.6 || 6.0 || 3.1 || 9.1 || 2.9 || 2.6 || 3
|- class="sortbottom"
! colspan=3| Career
! 27
! 19
! 9
! 135
! 63
! 198
! 64
! 52
! 0.7
! 0.3
! 5.0
! 2.3
! 7.3
! 2.4
! 1.9
! 6
|}

References

External links 

1997 births
Living people
Western Bulldogs (AFLW) players
Australian rules footballers from Victoria (Australia)
Essendon Football Club (AFLW) players
People educated at Melbourne Girls Grammar
People educated at Melbourne Grammar School